Orodrassus is a genus of North American ground spiders that was first described by R. V. Chamberlin in 1922.  it contains only three species: O. assimilis, O. canadensis, and O. coloradensis.

References

Araneomorphae genera
Gnaphosidae
Spiders of North America